Marius Stankevičius (born 15 July 1981) is a Lithuanian football manager and former player who works as head coach of the Lithuania U-21. A former defender, he was the Lithuanian player of the year in 2008 and 2009.

International career
Stankevičius has also played as a defender for the Lithuania national team. In the past, he represented Lithuania at under-21 level. He was captain of the Lithuanian side during the 2012–13 qualifying campaign due to Tomas Danilevičius's retirement, but has not made an appearance since the September 2013 loss to Latvia.

Due to playing in northern Italy, Stankevičius received a call-up for the Padania national team ahead of the 2018 ConIFA World Football Cup.

Coaching career
On 17 November 2018, Stankevičius was appointed as manager of Crema following the departure of Massimiliano Bressan, during a season, where he was supposed to function as a player. He left the club at the end of the season.

In January 2020 he was presented as the new U-17 coach of the Lithuania national football team and Valdas Urbonas's assistant for the senior team.

In July 2020 he was named new head coach of Italian Eccellenza amateurs Lumezzane, while still keeping his coaching position with the Lithuanian national teams. Following his appointment as new head coach of the Lithuania national under-21 football team, Stankevičius left Lumezzane in July 2021.

In October 2022, Stankevičius obtained a UEFA Pro coaching license after successfully passing the yearly course organized by the Italian Football Federation.

Career statistics

Club

International
Scores and results list Lithuania's goal tally first, score column indicates score after each Stankevičius goal.

Honours
Ekranas
 Lithuanian Cup: 1998, 2000
 Lithuanian Super Cup: 2000

Sampdoria
 Coppa Italia runner-up: 2008–09

Sevilla
 Copa del Rey: 2009–10

Lazio
 Coppa Italia: 2012–13

Individual
 Lithuanian Footballer of the Year: 2008, 2009

References

External links

1981 births
Living people
Sportspeople from Kaunas
A Lyga players
Association football defenders
Brescia Calcio players
Bundesliga players
Córdoba CF players
Cosenza Calcio 1914 players
Expatriate footballers in Germany
Expatriate footballers in Italy
Expatriate footballers in Spain
Expatriate footballers in Turkey
FK Ekranas players
Gaziantepspor footballers
Hannover 96 players
Hannover 96 II players
La Liga players
Lithuanian expatriate footballers
Lithuanian footballers
Lithuania international footballers
S.S. Lazio players
Segunda División players
Serie A players
Serie B players
Sevilla FC players
Süper Lig players
U.C. Sampdoria players
Valencia CF players